Jon Iles (born 17 May 1954 in Ripon, West Riding of Yorkshire) is an English actor who is best known for playing DC Mike Dashwood in The Bill from 1984 to 1992. He returned to the series in 1996, promoted to DS for the antiques squad. As well as a prolific stage career, Iles' other TV credits include To the Manor Born, The Dick Emery Show, Doctors, Crown Court, Law and Disorder, Never the Twain, Fresh Fields and Super Gran and the Super Match as Gary Bootle.

He now specialises in voiceover work for websites, training courses, documentaries and company videos, working from a recording studio in Devon. In 2016, he voiced a character for the video game "Enderal" and in 2017 he voiced the UK TV campaign for the martial arts movie Blade of the Immortal.

References

External links

The Bill Podcast Interview

English male television actors
People from Ripon
English male voice actors
1954 births
Living people